The 2012 Sivakasi factory explosion was an explosion at the Om Sakthi Fireworks Industries fireworks factory in Sivakasi, India, on 5 September 2012. 40 people were killed and more than 70 injured. The tragedy occurred in a fireworks factory which did not have a valid licence.

Background

Sivakasi, in Tamil Nadu in southern India, is considered the "fireworks capital" of India. The town produces more than 90% of India's fireworks and India is the second largest producer of fireworks in the world, next to China. More than 700 factories in Sivakasi make approximately $360 million worth of fireworks every year.

The Om Sakthi Fireworks Industries complex consisted of a single larger factory unit and 48 ancillary units. The company's fireworks license had been suspended only days earlier for violation of worker safety rules. Local police officials stated that the factory should have been closed at the time, owing to the suspension. Instead, more than 300 people were working in the facility when the explosion occurred. 
With the Hindu festival of Diwali only weeks away, fireworks producers were reportedly under pressure to maintain high production levels.

Explosion

The explosion occurred while workers were mixing certain chemicals to produce fireworks. Some reports suggest the high ambient temperature in the factory, reported to be , may have been a factor. The initial explosion and a subsequent series of explosions could be heard more than two kilometres away. 
Fire fighter entry to the buildings was delayed by a lack of equipment, including breathing apparatus. Efforts to treat victims were also delayed due to inadequate facilities at several local hospitals. It took more than five hours for fire fighters to extinguish the fire.

The initial death toll was 37, followed by reports several weeks later of a final confirmed total of 40 deaths and more than 70 injuries. Fatalities included factory workers and local villagers who walked in after the initial fire.

Petroleum and Explosives Safety Organization (PESO), Government of India started investigation on the  Explosion occurred on 05th September 2012, at 11.30 hrs at the Fire Works Factory premises of M/s Om Sakthi Fire Works Industries located at Vadi Village, Sivakasi Union and Taluk, Virudhunagar District, Tamilnadu covered under licence No.E/HQ/TN/20/1065(E25271) in Form LE-1 of Indian Explosives Rules 2008. Injured: 55, Killed: 40 . Dr. R.Venugopal, Controller of Explosives, PESO, Sivakasi investigated the accident and submitted the report to the Chief Controller of Explosives. The Report states that cause of the accident is the impact & friction or heat while ramming explosives composition into a shell of an aerial fireworks item by an inexperienced worker might have caused a spark which initiated fire and explosion.  The erratic stocking and drying of fireworks outside the working sheds contributed spread up of fire in the factory and to the fireworks transit shed which exploded later. Keeping of excess quantity of black and colour pellets, in this shed significantly contributed to the enormity of the power of explosion which instantly killed the people around.  15 major violations of Explosives Rules 2008 was reported in the accident investigation report submitted by R.Venugopal.^10^ The licence was cancelled by the Chief Controller of Explosives, Nagpur

Aftermath

Immediately after the incident, authorities began enforcing existing regulations, conducting raids and inspections, forcing some factories to close and cancelling several licences and as a consequence, 150 fireworks production units had been closed. 12 people were arrested, including the factory manager, and were charged with culpable homicide. The owner of Om Sakthi Fireworks Industries absconded soon after the incident and could not be found by police. Responding to reports of the arrests, local authorities called for a higher-level inquiry into the incident.

The following day (7 September), Tamil Nadu Chief Minister Jayalalithaa Jayaram announced a "magisterial probe"  to determine how the factory was allowed to continue even after its licence had been suspended.

References

Explosions in 2012
2012 disasters in India
2010s in Tamil Nadu
Disasters in Tamil Nadu
Virudhunagar district
2012 industrial disasters
Fires in India
Industrial fires and explosions in India
Explosions in India
Fireworks accidents and incidents
September 2012 events in India
^10Investigation Report No. ACC/SS/12/8 dated 07-Jan-2013 Submitted by Dr.R.Venugopal, Controller of Explosives, PESO, Sivakasi